Douglas Albert Baker Sr. (April 19, 1934 – October 20, 2014) was an American professional wrestler and actor, better known professionally as Ox Baker. He was famous for his distinctive eyebrows and finishing move, the Heart Punch, sometimes called the "Hurt Punch", after Baker's famous catchphrase "I love to hurt people!". He appeared in several movies including Blood Circus and Escape from New York.

Early life
Baker was an accomplished high school athlete in his adopted hometown of Waterloo, Iowa, but he quit school. Later he began wrestling to provide financial support to his family, having married and had children at a young age.

Professional wrestling career
Baker was trained by Buddy Austin, Pat O'Connor, and Bob Geigel, and debuted in 1964. As time went on, he was winning a majority of his matches by knockout caused by the Heart Punch; he later renamed the move the Hurt Punch when Stan Stasiak, from whom Baker adopted the move, objected. Initially debuting as a kind, horn-rimmed-glasses-wearing country simpleton, Baker later turned into a villain. He was known for his unique look with his shaved head and black bushy mustache and eyebrows and ability to cut a promo. He was also famous for wearing T-shirts to the ring, declaring himself "The Great Heart Puncher".

In 1967 Baker worked for the World Wide Wrestling Federation (WWWF) as The Friendly Arkansas Ox. In his first appearance there, Baker teamed with Armand Hussein in a handicap match versus Gorilla Monsoon. Later on, Baker went to fight in different promotions through North America, including Stampede Wrestling in Canada, the World Wrestling Council in Puerto Rico, and the United States-based American Wrestling Association throughout the 1970s. On June 13, 1971, Baker and his partner the Claw were wrestling in an AWA Midwest Tag Team Championship tag team match against Alberto Torres and “Cowboy” Bob Ellis in Verdigre, Nebraska. Torres died shortly after the match with the cause determined to be a result of heart disease. This was worked into an angle in which Baker's Heart Punch was blamed to reinforce Baker's wrestling heel persona. On August 1, 1972, Baker lost to Ray Gunkel. Following the match, Gunkel also died; his death has been variously attributed to a blood clot, which led to a heart attack or simply to heart disease. Again, the death was worked into Baker's character, and in 1974, a riot erupted in Cleveland, Ohio when Baker continually Heart Punched his opponent Ernie Ladd after the match was finished.

During his career he defeated "Cowboy" Bob Ellis for the World Wrestling Association's World Heavyweight Championship in Indianapolis and Carlos Colon for the WWC Universal Heavyweight Championship in Puerto Rico's World Wrestling Council. Baker beat The Sheik to win the Detroit version of the US Heavyweight title; he also won the NWA American Heavyweight Championship and the NWA Texas Heavyweight title several times. In addition, Baker was a multi-time tag team champion; he teamed with Ole Anderson and Skandor Akbar to capture tag team championships in the National Wrestling Alliance and National Wrestling Federation. Baker teamed with Chuck O'Connor to win the WWA World Tag Team Championship in 1976. He also teamed with Superstar Billy Graham to hold the NWA Florida Tag Team Championship. He is noted for a feud with Randy Savage in International Championship Wrestling, the southern promotion that Savage ran with his father Angelo Poffo and his brother Lanny Poffo. Late in his career, Baker appeared with Central States Wrestling as a face and feuded with Rip Rogers.

He returned to the WWF in 1980 and was given The Grand Wizard as his manager. Baker appeared at a TV taping in Allentown, Pennsylvania on March 25, but left shortly after and never wrestled for the WWF again.

In 1988, Baker returned to the AWA. Under contract with The AWA through TRB Sports LLC, Baker teamed up with George Petraski, The Russian Brute, of ICW fame. Later that same year he retired from wrestling. The following year he opened "Ox Baker's Wrestling School", becoming a well-renowned trainer. His students include The Undertaker, Bryan Clark, and Ox Baker Jr (Ronald Schell) as well as NWA New England Superstar The Dark Angel and his Kayfabe twin brother Micky Byggs of Wrestling Spotlite Radio/TV. He also did commentary for some IWCCW events in the early 1990s. Baker made an appearance in Ring of Honor in 2004 during their At Our Best event, confronting Dusty Rhodes before the show started and again during the main event that Rhodes was involved in. Baker also made an appearance in Combat Zone Wrestling on December 8, 2007, at Cage of Death 9 as the guest of Cult Fiction (Halfbreed Billy Gram and Toby Klein). In June 2008, Baker fought in two matches defeating Moonshine McCoy for Ultimate Championship Wrestling in Florida. In December 2013, Baker returned to the ring to be crowned the CCW Champion after being a surprise entrant in a thirteen-man battle royal in Ohio.

Acting career and other media

During the midst of his professional wrestling career, Baker appeared in many films from time to time, most notably during the late 1970s and early 1980s. He appeared as a fighter in Jackie Chan's The Big Brawl (1980) and as Kurt Russell's gladiatorial opponent in John Carpenter's Escape from New York (1981). In addition, he was cast in the professional wrestling film named for his catch phrase, I Like to Hurt People. On January 19, 1981, Baker was a contestant on the game show The Price is Right. In 1985, Ox Baker played the Russian in the wrestling movie Blood Circus, and in 2013, appeared in Chilling Visions: 5 Senses of Fear as The Butcher.

In 2005, a documentary based on the life and career of Baker was filmed, directed by Halfbreed Billy Gram, with the working title of I Love the People I Hurt: The Life and Legend of the Mighty Ox Baker. A short comedy feature titled My Smorgasboard with Ox, co-written and co-starring Baker and Gram, was also filmed during this time, with both remaining in post-production status.

In 2006, the North Carolina-based indie band the Mountain Goats released a song on their Babylon Springs EP titled "Ox Baker Triumphant", in which Baker is betrayed by the wrestling community and rises up to strike vengeance upon them. In 2011, Baker self-published his own cookbook, which included recipes and stories during his time in the wrestling business. In 2015, Veteran Pro Wrestling out of Groton, Connecticut held the first annual Ox Baker Memorial Cup. The winner for 2015 was Bad News Walter Swan and US Army Veteran "The Patriot Paul Severe", aka Jared Keefe. In 2016, the winner was "Rescue 911", aka Christopher Annino.

Personal life
Baker was married to Peggy Ann Kawa from 1996 to her passing in 2010. He had one son, Garren, who died in 2022, and one daughter, Meghan, two grandchildren, and one great grandchild.

Death
Baker died on October 20, 2014 in Hartford, Connecticut, due to complications from a heart attack he suffered earlier that year.

Championships and accomplishments
All Star Pro Wrestling (New Zealand)
NWA Australasian Tag Team Championship (1 time) – with King Kamaka
American Wrestling Association
AWA Midwest Tag Team Championship (3 times) – with Rock Rogowski (1), The Claw (1) and The Great Kusatsu (1)
Atlantic Coast Wrestling
ACW Tag Team Championship (1 time) – with Purple Haze
Big Time Wrestling
NWA United States Heavyweight Championship (Detroit Version) (1 time)
Cauliflower Alley Club
Other honoree (2002)
Championship Wrestling from Florida
NWA Florida Tag Team Championship (1 time) – with Superstar Billy Graham
NWA Southern Heavyweight Championship (Florida version) (1 time)
International Wrestling Association
IWA North American Heavyweight Championship (1 time)
Mid-Atlantic Championship Wrestling
NWA Mid-Atlantic Tag Team Championship (1 time) – with Carl Fergie
Mid-South Sports
NWA Georgia Tag Team Championship (1 time) – with Skandor Akbar
Midwest Championship Wrestling
MCW International Heavyweight Championship (1 time)
National Wrestling Alliance
NWA Hall of Fame (2014)
NWA Big Time Wrestling
NWA American Heavyweight Championship (2 times)
NWA Texas Heavyweight Championship (1 time)
NWA Hollywood Wrestling 
NWA Americas Tag Team Championship (1 time) – with Enforcer Luciano
NWA World Tag Team Championship (Los Angeles version) (1 time) – with Enforcer Luciano
NWA New Zealand
NWA British Commonwealth Heavyweight Championship (1 time)
National Wrestling Federation
NWF North American Heavyweight Championship (2 times)
New England Pro Wrestling Hall of Fame
Class of 2009
Pro Wrestling Academy (Connecticut)
Ox Baker "Old School" Heavyweight Championship (1 time)
Pro Wrestling Illustrated
Ranked No. 360 of the top 500 singles wrestlers in the PWI Years in 2003
Southeastern Championship Wrestling
NWA Southeastern Heavyweight Championship (Southern Division) (1 time)
Stampede Wrestling
Stampede North American Heavyweight Championship (1 time)
World Championship Wrestling (Australia)
NWA Austra-Asian Tag Team Championship (1 time) – with Butcher Brannigan
World Wrestling Association
WWA World Heavyweight Championship (1 time)
WWA World Tag Team Championship (1 time) – with Chuck O'Connor
World Wrestling Council
WWC Puerto Rico Heavyweight Championship (1 time)
WWC Universal Heavyweight Championship (1 time)

See also
 List of oldest surviving professional wrestlers

References

External links

 

1934 births
2014 deaths
American male professional wrestlers
Contestants on American game shows
People from Sedalia, Missouri
Professional wrestlers from Missouri
The First Family (professional wrestling) members
Stampede Wrestling alumni
20th-century professional wrestlers
21st-century professional wrestlers
WWC Universal Heavyweight Champions
WWC Puerto Rico Champions
NWF North American Heavyweight Champions
NWA Southern Heavyweight Champions (Florida version)
NWA Canadian Heavyweight Champions (Calgary version)
NWA Austra-Asian Tag Team Champions
NWA Georgia Tag Team Champions